Helge Folkert Meeuw (born 29 August 1984 from Wiesbaden, West Germany) is an Olympic and national record holding swimmer from Germany. He swam for Germany at the:
Olympics: 2004, 2008, 2012
World Championships: 2003, 2005, 2007, 2009, 2011
European Championships: 2006, 2012
World University Games: 2007, 2009
Short Course Worlds: 2006
Short Course Europeans: 2004, 2005, 2006, 2007, 2008

At the 2008 German Swimming Championships in Berlin, he swam in 53.10 sec a new European Record at 100m backstroke. He also holds 200 m (short course and long course) backstroke German national records in swimming.

Personal bests
Long course
 100 m backstroke 52.27 NR
 200 m backstroke 1:53.34 NR

Short course
 200 m backstroke 1'51.51 NR

Family
Both his parents, Folkert Meeuw and Jutta Weber, competed for West Germany in swimming, and both won medals at Olympic Games and World and European championships.  His wife, Antje Buschschulte, also competed for Germany and won Olympic medals.

References

External links
  
 
 
 

1984 births
Living people
German male swimmers
Male backstroke swimmers
German male butterfly swimmers
Swimmers at the 2004 Summer Olympics
Swimmers at the 2008 Summer Olympics
Swimmers at the 2012 Summer Olympics
Olympic swimmers of Germany
Olympic silver medalists for Germany
World Aquatics Championships medalists in swimming
Medalists at the FINA World Swimming Championships (25 m)
European Aquatics Championships medalists in swimming
Medalists at the 2004 Summer Olympics
Sportspeople from Wiesbaden
Olympic silver medalists in swimming
Universiade medalists in swimming
Universiade gold medalists for Germany
Universiade silver medalists for Germany
Medalists at the 2007 Summer Universiade
Medalists at the 2009 Summer Universiade
20th-century German people
21st-century German people